The 1939 Calgary Bronks season was the fifth season in franchise history where the team finished in 3rd place in the Western Interprovincial Football Union with a 4–7 record. The Bronks played in the WIFU Finals, but lost to the Winnipeg Blue Bombers in a two-game series by a total points score of 35–20.

Regular season

Standings

Schedule

Playoffs

Winnipeg won the total-point series by 35–20. Winnipeg advances to the Grey Cup game.

References

1939 in Alberta
1939 in Canadian sports